Gillygate is a street in York, in England, immediately north of the city centre.

History
The area occupied by the street lay outside the walls of Roman Eboracum, but evidence of occupation in this period has been found, and it is possible that a minor Roman road ran along it route.  During the Anglo-Saxon and Viking Jorvik period, the area appears to have been abandoned.  Gillygate was first recorded in the 12th century, at which time the church of St Giles, Gillygate, which gives the street its name, lay on the north-west side.  The south-east side was largely gardens owned by St Leonard's Hospital, but was gradually becoming built up with houses.  In 1354, the street was placed under the jurisdiction of the city of York.

By 1401, a chapel dedicated to St Antony existed on the street, but this was replaced by St Antony's Hospital by 1420 and became a private house in 1558.  St Giles Church was demolished in the 16th century, although burials in its graveyard continued into the following century, and the north-west side of the street remained large open fields in the 17th century.  Some small-scale industry existed in this period, including stone and coal yards, a smithy, and a clay pipe manufacturer.

While Gillygate lies just north-west of the York city walls, unlike elsewhere on their circuit, the buildings screening the wall have not been cleared, and so can only be occasionally glimpsed from the street.  In 1972, Nikolaus Pevsner described the street as "a run-down Georgian Street with two interesting houses", these being 3-5 and 26-28 Gillygate.  It is now a street with predominantly independent shops.  In 2013, the City of York Council claimed that "over the last 30 years, the quality of shops and businesses here has risen generally".  However, it forms part of the city's inner ring road, and has heavy traffic.

Layout and architecture

Gillygate starts at a junction with Bootham, opposite Queen Margaret's Arch, through which Exhibition Square can be accessed.  The junction is close to Bootham Bar and St Leonard's Place.  The street runs north-east, with several junctions on its north-west side, leading to Millers Yard, St Giles Yard, St Giles Gate and Portland Street, before ending at a junction with Lord Mayor's Walk, Clarence Street and Claremont Terrace.

Notable buildings on the north-west side of the street include 3-5 Gillygate, built in 1797 by Thomas Wolstenholme; early 19th-century buildings at 9, 11, 13, 19 and 21 Gillygate; 18th-century houses at 23 and 25 Gillygate; more early-19th century buildings at 59, 61, 65, 67, 69, 71 and 73 Gillygate; and the Salvation Army Citadel.  On the south-east side lie early 18th-century houses at 12 and 16-20 Gillygate; 26-28 Gillygate, built in 1769 by Robert Clough; the late 18th-century 38-40 Gillygate; 42-44 Gillygate, of the early 19th-century; 50–52, 58 and 62, all of the 18th-century; 64 Gillygate, the oldest building on the street, with 17th-century origins; then more late 18th-century houses at 66, 68 and 68a, 70, and 82 Gillygate; and the early-19th century 84 and 86 Gillygate.

References

Streets in York